Hearts in Exile is a 1915 American film directed by James Young. It was produced by Peerless Pictures Studios when it and many other early film studios in America's first motion picture industry were based in Fort Lee, New Jersey at the beginning of the 20th century. A print of the film survives in the Archiva Nationala de Filme film archive.

The film is also known as Hearts Afire (American reissue title).

Cast
Clara Kimball Young as Hope Ivanovna
Montagu Love as Count Nicolai
Claude Fleming as Serge Palma
Vernon Steele as Paul Pavloff
Frederick Truesdell as Captain Sokaloff
Paul McAllister as Ivan Mikhail
Bert Starkey as Victor Rasloff
Clarissa Selwynne as Madame Romanoff

References

External links

1915 films
American silent feature films
1915 drama films
1910s English-language films
American black-and-white films
Films based on British novels
Silent American drama films
World Film Company films
Films shot at Peerless Studios
1910s American films